Francorchamps is a village of Wallonia and a district of the municipality of Stavelot, located in the province of Liège, Belgium. 

It is home to the motor-racing Circuit de Spa-Francorchamps.

External links
 

Stavelot
Former municipalities of Liège Province